Rhenish Girls and Rhenish Wine (German: Ein rheinisches Mädchen beim rheinischen Wein) is a 1927 German silent film directed by Johannes Guter and starring Xenia Desni, Jack Trevor and Elisabeth Pinajeff. The film's art direction was by Jacek Rotmil.

Cast
 Xenia Desni as Hannchen 
 Jack Trevor as Baron Wendlingen 
 Elisabeth Pinajeff as Juliette Grinot 
 Hans Brausewetter as Valentin Hoff 
 Paul Biensfeldt as Kammerdiener des Barons 
 Adele Sandrock as Hausdame im Schloss
 Hermann Picha   
 Ralph Arthur Roberts

References

Bibliography
Prawer, S.S. Between Two Worlds: The Jewish Presence in German and Austrian Film, 1910–1933. Berghahn Books, 2005.

External links

1927 films
Films of the Weimar Republic
German silent feature films
Films directed by Johannes Guter
Films set in Germany
German black-and-white films